Whitmire Creek is a stream tributary to Animas Creek within Hidalgo County, New Mexico. It is one of two creeks of that name that are tributary to Animas Creek in the Animas Valley. They both were named for J. B. Whitmire one of the first settlers that established the Whitmire Ranch in the area during the 1880s.

References 

Rivers of Hidalgo County, New Mexico
Rivers of New Mexico